The 1988 NASCAR Winston Cup Series was the 40th season of professional stock car racing in the United States and the 17th modern-era Cup series. The season began on February 7 at Daytona International Speedway and ended on November 20 at the Atlanta International Speedway. Bill Elliott of Melling Racing won the championship.

The 1988 season was notable for hosting the first of two tire wars between Goodyear and Hoosier.

1988 was the first season without NASCAR legend Tim Richmond since 1980.

Teams and drivers

Complete schedule

Limited schedule

Schedule

Races

Busch Clash 
The Busch Clash, an invitational event for all Busch Pole winners the previous season, was held February 7 at Daytona International Speedway. Geoff Bodine drew for the pole.

Top ten results

 3 - Dale Earnhardt
 28 - Davey Allison
 12 - Bobby Allison
 5 - Geoff Bodine
 9 - Bill Elliott
 27 - Rusty Wallace
 25 - Ken Schrader
 97 - Morgan Shepherd
 11 - Terry Labonte
 33 - Harry Gant

Tim Richmond was eligible to race in this event, but was without a ride.

Gatorade 125s 

The Gatorade 125s, a pair of qualifying races for the Daytona 500, were held February 11 at Daytona International Speedway. Ken Schrader and Davey Allison won the poles for the races.

Race one: top ten results

 12 - Bobby Allison
 27 - Rusty Wallace
 25 - Ken Schrader
 50 - Greg Sacks
 8 - Bobby Hillin Jr.
 97 - Morgan Shepherd
 4 - Rick Wilson
 5 - Geoff Bodine
 14 - A. J. Foyt
 55 - Phil Parsons

Race two: top ten results

 17 - Darrell Waltrip
 3 - Dale Earnhardt
 28 - Davey Allison
 11 - Terry Labonte
 83 - Lake Speed
 44 - Sterling Marlin
 75 - Neil Bonnett
 7 - Alan Kulwicki
 88 - Buddy Baker
 33 - Harry Gant

Daytona 500 
The Daytona 500, was held February 14, 1988, at Daytona International Speedway in Daytona Beach, Florida. Ken Schrader won the pole.

Top ten results

 12 - Bobby Allison
 28 - Davey Allison
 55 - Phil Parsons
 75 - Neil Bonnett
 11 - Terry Labonte
 25 - Ken Schrader
 27 - Rusty Wallace
 44 - Sterling Marlin
 88 - Buddy Baker
 3 - Dale Earnhardt

Failed to qualify: 34 - Donnie Allison, 07 - Larry Moyer, 82 - Mark Stahl, 18 - Sarel van der Merwe, 85 - Bobby Gerhart, 2 - Ernie Irvan (R), 30 - Michael Waltrip*, 67 - Buddy Arrington, 10-Ken Bouchard (R), 24 - Bobby Coyle, 01 - Mickey Gibbs (R), 77 - Ken Ragan, 63 - Jocko Maggiacomo, 03 - David Pletcher, 54 - Ronnie Sanders, 80 - Jimmy Horton, 0 - Delma Cowart, 59 - Mark Gibson, 70 - J.D. McDuffie, 48 - Tony Spanos, 74 - John Linville, 02 - Joe Booher, 64 - Mike Potter, 39 - Blackie Wangerin, 56 - Joey Sonntag, 57 - Bobby Wawak, 49 - Mike Porter

This was Bobby Allison's final career victory.

Pontiac Excitement 400 

The Pontiac Excitement 400 was held February 21 at Richmond Fairgrounds Raceway. The No. 97 of Morgan Shepherd won the pole.

Top ten results

 75 - Neil Bonnett
 26 - Ricky Rudd
 43 - Richard Petty
 17 - Darrell Waltrip
 44 - Sterling Marlin
 83 - Lake Speed
 27 - Rusty Wallace
 8 - Bobby Hillin Jr.
 11 - Terry Labonte
 3 - Dale Earnhardt

Failed to qualify: 2 - Ernie Irvan, 4 - Rick Wilson, 25* - Ken Schrader

Ken Schrader's team bought the No. 67 entry (normally driven by Buddy Arrington) in order to get Schrader into the race.
This was the last race on the half-mile Richmond Fairgrounds Raceway. After the race, workers immediately began to convert the track into a more modern-looking, 3/4-mile oval.
A scoring error failed to show that Neil Bonnett was one lap down after making a green flag pit stop. A post-race protest filed by Ricky Rudd's car owner Kenny Bernstein did not resolve the NASCAR scoring error and Bonnett's win stood even though a review of the race tape showed that Rudd should have won.
Last career top 5 finish for Richard Petty.

Goodyear NASCAR 500 

The Goodyear NASCAR 500 was a non-points exhibition race held on February 28 at the Calder Park Thunderdome in Melbourne, Australia - the first NASCAR-style high-banked paved oval built outside of North America. It was also the first NASCAR sanctioned race outside of North America. Neil Bonnett won the pole.

Top ten results

 75 - Neil Bonnett
 12 - Bobby Allison
 71 - Dave Marcis
 18 - Glen Steurer
 83 - Sumner McKnight
 98 - Hershel McGriff
 15 - Terry Petris
 19 - Chad Little
 82 - Jim Danielson
 21 - Kyle Petty

 The race had 32 starters - 24 Americans, 7 Australians and 1 New Zealander. Of the locals only Allan Grice had previously driven a NASCAR race having competed in the 1987 Coca-Cola 600. The 'visiting' American drivers were a mix of those from the Winston Cup and Winston West Series.
 The Thunderdome, a 1.119 mi (1.801 km) track with 24° banking in the turns, was actually modelled on a scaled down version of the Charlotte Motor Speedway and was opened in 1987.
 As the race was run in Australia where the metric system is used, the '500' was actually 500 kilometers (310 miles), or around the same distance as a Busch Series race.
 Bonnett's pole speed was 139.734 mp/h. The race's average speed over the 280 laps was 101.67 mp/h. 52 laps were run under caution.

Goodwrench 500 

The Goodwrench 500 was held March 6 at North Carolina Motor Speedway. Bill Elliott won the pole.

Top ten results

 75 - Neil Bonnett*
 83 - Lake Speed
 44 - Sterling Marlin
 7 - Alan Kulwicki
 3 - Dale Earnhardt
 9 - Bill Elliott
 97 - Morgan Shepherd
 10 - Ken Bouchard
 28 - Davey Allison
 25 - Ken Schrader

This was Neil Bonnett's final Winston Cup Series win and also that of RahMoc Enterprises.
Final top 5 for Neil Bonnett.
Final time in his career as well that Neil Bonnett win multiple races in a season.
Final time in his career that Neil Bonnett won back-to-back races.

Motorcraft Quality Parts 500 

The Motorcraft Quality Parts 500 was held March 20 at Atlanta International Raceway. The No. 5 of Geoff Bodine won the pole.

Top ten results

 3 - Dale Earnhardt
 27 - Rusty Wallace
 17 - Darrell Waltrip
 11 - Terry Labonte
 21 - Kyle Petty
 8 - Bobby Hillin Jr.
 88 - Buddy Baker
 25 - Ken Schrader
 15 - Brett Bodine
 4 - Rick Wilson

This race marked Dale Earnhardt's first victory since switching sponsors to GM Goodwrench.

TranSouth 500 

The TranSouth 500 was held March 27 at Darlington Raceway. The No. 25 of Ken Schrader won the pole.

Top ten results

 83 - Lake Speed*
 7 - Alan Kulwicki
 28 - Davey Allison
 9 - Bill Elliott
 44 - Sterling Marlin
 6 - Mark Martin
 5 - Geoff Bodine
 55 - Phil Parsons
 12 - Bobby Allison
 88 - Buddy Baker

This was Lake Speed's only victory in the Winston Cup Series.

Valleydale Meats 500 

The Valleydale Meats 500 was held April 10 at Bristol International Raceway. The No. 4 of Rick Wilson won the pole.

Top ten results

 9 - Bill Elliott*
 6 - Mark Martin
 5 - Geoff Bodine
 27 - Rusty Wallace
 12 - Bobby Allison
 43 - Richard Petty
 21 - Kyle Petty
 44 - Sterling Marlin
 71 - Dave Marcis
 25 - Ken Schrader

First Union 400 

The First Union 400 was held April 17 at North Wilkesboro Speedway. Terry Labonte won the pole.  

Top ten results

 11 - Terry Labonte
 26 - Ricky Rudd
 3 - Dale Earnhardt
 27 - Rusty Wallace
 21 - Kyle Petty
 43 - Richard Petty
 55 - Phil Parsons
 28 - Davey Allison
 5 - Geoff Bodine
 9 - Bill Elliott

Failed to qualify: 00 - Gary Brooks, 04 - Bill Meacham, 09 - Doug French, 20 - Alan Russell, 31 - Brad Teague, 46 - Glenn Moffat, 67 - Rick Jeffrey, 70 - Jeff McDuffie, 78 - Jay Sommers, 98 - Brad Noffsinger

Labonte passed Dale Earnhardt with 10 laps to go when Earnhardt suffered a slow leak of air from his right rear tire.

Pannill Sweatshirts 500 

The Pannill Sweatshirts 500 was held April 24 at Martinsville Speedway. The No. 26 of Ricky Rudd won the pole.

Top ten results

 3 - Dale Earnhardt
 44 - Sterling Marlin
 8 - Bobby Hillin Jr.
 11 - Terry Labonte
 17 - Darrell Waltrip
 28 - Davey Allison
 88 - Buddy Baker
 12 - Bobby Allison
 55 - Phil Parsons
 25 - Ken Schrader

Failed to qualify: 2 - Ernie Irvan, 52 - Jimmy Means

Winston 500 

The Winston 500 was held May 1 at Alabama International Motor Speedway. The No. 28 of Davey Allison won the pole. 

Top ten results

 55 - Phil Parsons*
 12 - Bobby Allison
 5 - Geoff Bodine
 11 - Terry Labonte
 25 - Ken Schrader
 44 - Sterling Marlin
 9 - Bill Elliott
 21 - Kyle Petty
 3 - Dale Earnhardt
 27 - Rusty Wallace

Failed to qualify: 10 - Ken Bouchard

During the race, A. J. Foyt had a series of incidents and penalties. He intentionally wrecked Alan Kulwicki, spun out on pit road out of anger, and drove through several pit stalls doing pass-through penalties, nearly hurting many pit crew members. For his actions, Foyt was issued a six month ban from NASCAR (which was later reduced to two months following an appeal).
This was Phil Parsons' only win in the Winston Cup Series.
Last Top 5 finish for Bobby Allison in a points-paying race.

The Winston 

The Winston, an annual invitational race for previous winners in Winston Cup along with the winner of the same day Winston Open, was held May 22 at Charlotte Motor Speedway. Terry Labonte won the race.

Top ten results

 11-Terry Labonte
 44-Sterling Marlin (Winston Open Winner)
 28-Davey Allison
 9-Bill Elliott
 12-Bobby Allison
 21-Kyle Petty
 3-Dale Earnhardt
 47-Morgan Shepherd
 17-Darrell Waltrip
 75-Neil Bonnett

Tim Richmond was eligible to run The Winston, but he chose not to participate due to an ongoing legal dispute with NASCAR after he was suspended for testing positive for banned substances earlier during the season.
Richard Petty was eligible to run the race as a past winner, but was eliminated when Phil Parsons won the Winston 500.
Last overall Top 5 finish for Bobby Allison.

Coca-Cola 600 

The Coca-Cola 600 was held May 29 at Charlotte Motor Speedway. Davey Allison won the pole.

Top ten results

 17 - Darrell Waltrip
 27 - Rusty Wallace
 7 - Alan Kulwicki
 15 - Brett Bodine
 28 - Davey Allison
 25 - Ken Schrader
 26 - Ricky Rudd*
 55 - Phil Parsons
 11 - Terry Labonte
 50 - Greg Sacks

Prior to the race, Goodyear withdrew their tires after practice when it was discovered that their compound was too soft for the track; as a result, all drivers except Dave Marcis switched to Hoosiers over safety concerns. Goodyear offered Daytona-spec tires for those who wanted them.
Ricky Rudd was relieved during the race by Mike Alexander (Rudd had suffered injuries from a crash at The Winston). 
 In addition to Ricky Rudd having to be relieved from his injuries at the Winston a week earlier, other drivers injured during the race included Harry Gant, who suffered a broken leg during a crash; Buddy Baker, who suffered a hard crash on lap 243 that resulted in a blood clot in his brain; Neil Bonnett, who suffered cracked ribs in a crash and Rick Wilson, who led 107 laps before crashing due to tire failure, with Wilson suffering a broken shoulder blade as a result. The injuries weren't limited to drivers, as Bud Moore Engineering owner Bud Moore suffered a broken leg when his driver, Brett Bodine, ran over him during a pit stop.
Dale Earnhardt was issued a five lap penalty after spinning out Geoff Bodine early in the race. He would finish 13th, 6 laps down.
This race made sure no driver would win 3 out of 4 Crown Jewel races meaning no driver would win the Winston Million in 1988. However the $100,000 bonus to a driver winning 2 out of 4 Crown Jewel races was still alive for the Southern 500 later in the season.

Budweiser 500 

The Budweiser 500 was held June 5 at Dover Downs International Speedway. Alan Kulwicki won the pole.

Top ten results

 9 - Bill Elliott
 33 - Morgan Shepherd*
 27 - Rusty Wallace
 83 - Lake Speed
 28 - Davey Allison
 7 - Alan Kulwicki
 4 - Rick Wilson
 5 - Geoff Bodine
 6 - Mark Martin
 12 - Bobby Allison

Morgan Shepherd was subbing for Harry Gant, who had been injured (broken leg) during the Coca-Cola 600 race the previous weekend.

Last Top 10 finish for Bobby Allison.

Budweiser 400 

The final Budweiser 400 was held June 12 at Riverside International Raceway. Ricky Rudd won the pole. It was the last NASCAR race held at Riverside before the track's closure.

Top ten results

 27 - Rusty Wallace
 11 - Terry Labonte
 26 - Ricky Rudd
 3 - Dale Earnhardt
 55 - Phil Parsons
 43 - Richard Petty*
 6 - Mark Martin
 29 - Dale Jarrett
 44 - Sterling Marlin
 75 - Neil Bonnett

Failed to qualify: 10 - Ken Bouchard

For this race Richard Petty was forced to go to a backup car that was a 1987 Pontiac Grand Prix 2+2.

Miller High Life 500 

The Miller High Life 500 was held June 19 at Pocono International Raceway. The No. 7 of Alan Kulwicki won the pole.

Top ten results

 5 - Geoff Bodine
 30 - Michael Waltrip
 27 - Rusty Wallace
 6 - Mark Martin
 28 - Davey Allison
 17 - Darrell Waltrip
 88 - Buddy Baker
 55 - Phil Parsons
 25 - Ken Schrader
 9 - Bill Elliott

On the opening lap of this race, Bobby Allison suffered career-ending injuries when he spun and was T-boned by the No. 63 of Jocko Maggiacomo.

Miller High Life 400 (Michigan) 

The Miller High Life 400 was held June 26 at Michigan International Speedway. Bill Elliott won the pole.

Top ten results

 27 - Rusty Wallace
 9 - Bill Elliott
 11 - Terry Labonte
 3 - Dale Earnhardt
 5 - Geoff Bodine
 25 - Ken Schrader
 55 - Phil Parsons
 17 - Darrell Waltrip
 29 - Cale Yarborough
 12 - Mike Alexander*

 Mike Alexander would take over the 12 car for the remainder of the season.

Pepsi Firecracker 400 

The Pepsi Firecracker 400 was held July 2 at Daytona International Speedway. Darrell Waltrip won the pole.

Top ten results

 9 - Bill Elliott
 4 - Rick Wilson
 55 - Phil Parsons
 3 - Dale Earnhardt
 17 - Darrell Waltrip
 88 - Buddy Baker
 33 - Morgan Shepherd
 25 - Ken Schrader
 83 - Lake Speed
 50 - Greg Sacks

This was the first Pepsi Firecracker 400 run with restrictor plates since 1973, and was notable for a very close finish. Bill Elliott charged from 38th starting position, and nearly fell a lap down at one point. On the final lap, Elliott battled with Rick Wilson out of the final turn, with Elliott taking the win by 18 inches. The second place would be Wilson's best career finish.
This race marked the final start at Daytona for Cale Yarborough. He was involved in a crash on the second lap, dropped out and finished 41st.

AC Spark Plug 500 

The AC Spark Plug 500 was held July 24 at Pocono International Raceway. Morgan Shepherd won the pole.

Top ten results

 9 - Bill Elliott
 25 - Ken Schrader
 28 - Davey Allison
 5 - Geoff Bodine
 17 - Darrell Waltrip
 75 - Morgan Shepherd*
 6 - Mark Martin
 7 - Alan Kulwicki
 11 - Terry Labonte
 33 - Harry Gant*

Morgan Shepherd drove the No. 75 in place of Neil Bonnett for this race and Talladega.
This was Harry Gant's first race back from injury.
Goodyear was disallowed from using their tires in this race after a pre-race inspection found that the tires had too wide of a tread. This marked the first time since the 1956 Southern 500 that Goodyear did not supply tires for a NASCAR race.

Talladega DieHard 500 

The Talladega DieHard 500 was held July 31 at Talladega Superspeedway. The No. 17 of Darrell Waltrip won the pole.

Top ten results

 25 - Ken Schrader*
 5 - Geoff Bodine
 3 - Dale Earnhardt
 4 - Rick Wilson
 27 - Rusty Wallace
 44 - Sterling Marlin
 6 - Mark Martin
 9 - Bill Elliott
 29 - Cale Yarborough
 88 - Buddy Baker*

This was Ken Schrader's first career Winston Cup Series win and the final win for Harry Hyde.

This was Buddy Baker's final top ten finish in the Cup Series and his final start of 1988 as the aforementioned blood clot ended his season.

Budweiser at The Glen 

The Budweiser at The Glen was held August 14 at Watkins Glen International. Geoff Bodine won the pole.

Top ten results

 26 - Ricky Rudd
 27 - Rusty Wallace
 9 - Bill Elliott
 55 - Phil Parsons
 12 - Mike Alexander
 3 - Dale Earnhardt
 88 - Morgan Shepherd*
 44 - Sterling Marlin
 31 - Joe Ruttman*
 25 - Ken Schrader

Morgan Shepherd was subbing for Buddy Baker, who had suffered a blood clot in his brain in a crash in the Coca-Cola 600 earlier in the season.
This was the best finish in the Winston Cup Series for Bob Clark's No. 31 Slender You Figure Salons team.
Much like Goodyear at Pocono, Hoosier was disallowed after the tread on their tires was discovered to be too wide.
Final race for Jocko Maggiacomo; who finished 35th in this, the first race he attempted after the crash in Pocono that ended the career of Bobby Allison. Maggiacomo would attempt to qualify for the fall Charlotte and Rockingham races; failing to make the field in either track.

Champion Spark Plug 400 

The Champion Spark Plug 400 was held August 21 at Michigan International Speedway. Bill Elliott won the pole.

Top ten results

 28 - Davey Allison
 27 - Rusty Wallace
 9 - Bill Elliott
 88 - Morgan Shepherd
 83 - Lake Speed
 15 - Brett Bodine
 30 - Michael Waltrip
 21 - Kyle Petty
 4 - Rick Wilson
 5 - Geoff Bodine

 This was the final career start for Donnie Allison. He would finish 35th after only completing 114 of the 200 laps due to an engine failure.

Busch 500 

The Busch 500 was held August 27 at Bristol International Raceway. Alan Kulwicki won the pole.

Top ten results

 3 - Dale Earnhardt
 9 - Bill Elliott
 5 - Geoff Bodine
 28 - Davey Allison
 7 - Alan Kulwicki
 33 - Harry Gant
 17 - Darrell Waltrip
 43 - Richard Petty
 27 - Rusty Wallace*
 8 - Bobby Hillin Jr.

Failed to qualify: 10 - Ken Bouchard, 90 - Benny Parsons

During practice on Friday, Rusty Wallace wrecked and barrel-rolled down the frontstretch, knocking him unconscious. ESPN pit reporter Dr. Jerry Punch happened to be the first person on the scene and actually revived Wallace. Wallace would recover, and started the race Saturday night, but eventually turned the car over to relief driver Larry Pearson.

 Rick Mast made his Cup Series debut driving car 88 in place of the injured Buddy Baker. He would finish 28th completing 207 of 500 laps due to crashing the car.

Southern 500 

The Southern 500 was held September 4 at Darlington Raceway. Bill Elliott won the pole.

Top ten results

 9 - Bill Elliott
 27 - Rusty Wallace
 3 - Dale Earnhardt
 17 - Darrell Waltrip
 44 - Sterling Marlin
 55 - Phil Parsons
 5 - Geoff Bodine
 11 - Terry Labonte
 28 - Davey Allison
 26 - Ricky Rudd

Since the season's final Crown Jewel race was not won by any of the other three drivers that won the three previous Crown Jewel races earlier in the season, no one was eligible to win the $100,000 bonus from Winston.

Miller High Life 400 (Richmond) 

The Miller High Life 400 was held September 11 at Richmond International Raceway (formerly known as Richmond Fairgrounds Raceway). Davey Allison won the pole. This race was the first one for the Cup Series on the new 3/4-mile Richmond International Raceway.

Top ten results

 28 - Davey Allison*
 3 - Dale Earnhardt
 11 - Terry Labonte
 6 - Mark Martin
 7 -  Alan Kulwicki
 21 - Kyle Petty
 9 - Bill Elliott
 17 - Darrell Waltrip
 75 - Neil Bonnett
 71 - Dave Marcis

Failed to qualify: 68 - Derrike Cope, 20 - Rayvon Clark, 37 - Randy Morrison, 40 - Ben Hess, 54 - Lennie Pond, 67 - Ron Esau, 70 - J. D. McDuffie, 78 - Jay Sommers, 98 - Brad Noffsinger

Not only was this Allison's first short track victory in the Cup Series, it was also one of two times he won a Cup race from the pole.

Delaware 500 

The Delaware 500 was held September 18 at Dover International Speedway. The No. 6 of Mark Martin won the pole. It was Roush Racing's 1st pole.

Top ten results

 9 - Bill Elliott
 3 - Dale Earnhardt
 27 - Rusty Wallace
 28 - Davey Allison
 5 - Geoff Bodine
 21 - Kyle Petty
 12 - Mike Alexander
 75 - Neil Bonnett
 83 - Lake Speed
 26 - Ricky Rudd

 Ken Bouchard (who would go on the win this season's rookie of the year) led the only 4 laps in his Cup career eventually finishing 25th completing 409 of 500 laps due to crashing the car.

Goody's 500 

The Goody's 500 was held September 25 at Martinsville Speedway. Rusty Wallace won the pole.

Top ten results

 17 - Darrell Waltrip
 7 - Alan Kulwicki
 27 - Rusty Wallace
 25 - Ken Schrader
 5 - Geoff Bodine
 9 - Bill Elliott
 11 - Terry Labonte
 3 - Dale Earnhardt
 6 - Mark Martin
 15 - Brett Bodine

Failed to qualify: 20 - Dave Mader III, 31 - Lee Faulk, 70 - J. D. McDuffie, 97 - Rodney Combs, 98 - Brad Noffsinger

Oakwood Homes 500 

The Oakwood Homes 500 was held October 9 at Charlotte Motor Speedway.  The No. 7 of Alan Kulwicki won the pole.

Top ten results

 27 - Rusty Wallace
 17 - Darrell Waltrip
 15 - Brett Bodine
 9 - Bill Elliott
 44 - Sterling Marlin
 8 - Bobby Hillin Jr.
 25 - Ken Schrader
 26 - Ricky Rudd
 6 - Mark Martin
 11 - Terry Labonte

Failed to qualify: ?? - Gary Brooks, ?? - Slick Johnson, ?? - Johnny Rutherford, ?? - Ronnie Silver, 2 - Ernie Irvan, 19 - Chad Little, 22 - Rodney Combs, 24 - John McFadden, 32 - Philip Duffie, 34 - Connie Saylor, 36 - H. B. Bailey, 40 - Ben Hess, 50 - Charlie Glotzbach, 59 - Mark Gibson, 63 - Jocko Maggiacomo, 64 - Mike Potter, 70 - J. D. McDuffie, 74 - Randy LaJoie, 87 - Randy Baker, 93 - Troy Beebe, 98 - Brad Noffsinger

 Benny Parsons led the final laps of his career (13) en route to a 12th place finish, 2 laps down to the winner.

Holly Farms 400 

The Holly Farms 400 was held October 16 at North Wilkesboro Speedway. The event was originally scheduled for October 2, but two consecutive days of rain caused it to be rescheduled for October 16. Bill Elliott won the pole.

Top ten results

 27 - Rusty Wallace
 55 - Phil Parsons
 5 - Geoff Bodine
 11 - Terry Labonte
 9 - Bill Elliott
 3 - Dale Earnhardt
 26 - Ricky Rudd
 25 - Ken Schrader
 12 - Mike Alexander
 88 - Greg Sacks*

Failed to qualify: 68 - Derrike Cope

Greg Sacks subbed for the still recovering Buddy Baker.

AC Delco 500 

The AC Delco 500 was held October 23 at North Carolina Motor Speedway. Bill Elliott won the pole. 

Top ten results

 27 - Rusty Wallace
 26 - Ricky Rudd
 11 - Terry Labonte
 9 - Bill Elliott
 3 - Dale Earnhardt
 12 - Mike Alexander
 33 - Harry Gant
 55 - Phil Parsons
 21 - Kyle Petty
 75 - Neil Bonnett

This race was the third consecutive win for Rusty Wallace.

Checker 500 

The inaugural Checker 500 was held November 6 at Phoenix International Raceway. Geoff Bodine won the pole.

Top ten results

 7 - Alan Kulwicki*
 11 - Terry Labonte
 28 - Davey Allison
 9 - Bill Elliott
 27 - Rusty Wallace
 5 - Geoff Bodine
 8 - Bobby Hillin Jr.
 90 - Benny Parsons
 55 - Phil Parsons
 44 - Sterling Marlin

This was Alan Kulwicki's first career Winston Cup Series win. After taking the checkered flag, Kulwicki turned the car clockwise around and completed what he eventually referred to as a "Polish victory lap." Kulwicki, himself a Polish American, wanted to be able to wave to the fans directly from his driver's side window.
In the final race he completed (the final race he ran, the Atlanta Journal 500, would see him crash out on lap 140), Benny Parsons finished 8th; one spot ahead of younger brother Phil.
Dale Earnhardt, 3rd in the points coming into this race, still had a mathematical chance to win a third consecutive Winston Cup championship (though it required a large points gain and trouble to befall Bill Elliott and Rusty Wallace). However, Earnhardt was involved in a crash early with Joe Ruttman and lost a lap. Earnhardt would salvage an 11th place finish but the crash and both Elliott and Wallace finishing in the Top 5 ended Earnhardt's hopes of a Winston Cup three-peat.
Ricky Rudd had a dominating run until his Quaker State-sponsored #26 Buick began overheating late in the race and ultimately the engine blew before Rudd could pit to allow his crew to top off the radiator.

Atlanta Journal 500 

The Atlanta Journal 500 was held November 20 at Atlanta International Raceway. Rusty Wallace won the pole.

Top ten results

 27 - Rusty Wallace
 28 - Davey Allison
 12 - Mike Alexander
 26 - Ricky Rudd
 17 - Darrell Waltrip
 25 - Ken Schrader
 30 - Michael Waltrip -1 Lap
 11 - Terry Labonte -1 Lap
 8 - Bobby Hillin Jr. -1 Lap
 29 - Cale Yarborough -1 Lap*

Failed to qualify: ?? - Don Hume, ?? - Bill Meacham, ?? - Alan Russell, ?? - Joe Ruttman, ?? - David Sosebee, 10 - Ken Bouchard, 20 - Dave Mader III, 38 - Mike Laws, 50 - Bobby Coyle, 78 - Jay Sommers, 93 - Charlie Baker

In addition to winning from the pole, Wallace also led the most laps in the race. But Bill Elliott, needing only to finish 18th or better to secure the Winston Cup championship, won the title with an 11th place finish.
Benny Parsons, in his 525th and final NASCAR start, crashed out on lap 140, finishing 34th.
This was the final career start in the Winston Cup Series for Cale Yarborough and his final top ten finish.
Out of 42 starters, only 20 finished.
Out of the 22 cars that fell out of the race, 16 of them were engine related.

Full Drivers' Championship

(key) Bold – Pole position awarded by time. Italics – Pole position set by owner's points. * – Most laps led.

Rookie of the Year 

Ken Bouchard defeated Ernie Irvan by 59 points to win the Rookie of the Year title in 1988, driving for Bob Whitcomb. Bouchard raced only eight more times in the Cup series over his career, while Irvan won fifteen races over the next twelve years (his first victory was in 1990). The only other contenders were USAC driver Brad Noffsinger and Jimmy Horton, both of whom ran part-time schedules that season.

See also
1988 NASCAR Busch Series

References

External links 
Winston Cup Standings and Statistics for 1988 

 
NASCAR Cup Series seasons